Armand François Léon de Wailly (28 July 1804 – 25 April 1864) was a 19th-century French novelist, playwright, adaptor and translator.

Biography 
He became known for his numerous translations of English writers (poetry) and his collaboration with P. J. Stahl in the adaptation of British classics (including William Shakespeare). Gustave de Wailly was his brother.

Works 
1825: Le Mort dans l’embarras, comédie nouvelle, in 3 acts and in verse, with Gustave de Wailly
1834: Benvenuto Cellini, opera in 2 acts, libretto with Henri Auguste Barbier and Alfred de Vigny, music by Hector Berlioz
1838: Angelica Kauffmann
1844: L’Héritage de vie
1848: Pensées morales et maximes
1854: Stella et Vanessa 
1855: L'oncle Tom, drama in 5 acts and 9 tableaux 
1860: Les Deux filles de M. Dubreuil 
1862: Le Doyen de Saint-Patrick (drama in 5 acts, in prose with Louis Ulbach)

Translations 
He translated works from Matthew Gregory Lewis (The Monk), Jonathan Swift, Shakespeare, Henry Fielding (The History of Tom Jones, a Foundling), Robert Burns (Poésies complètes), Laurence Sterne (The Life and Opinions of Tristram Shandy, Gentleman) and also Fanny Burney (Evelina).

Adaptations 
 Mary Bell, William et Lafaine. La vie des enfants en Amérique, Adapted from English by P.-J. Stahl and de Wailly, Hetzel, 1895
 Les Vacances de Riquet et de Madeleine, Adapted from English by P.-J. Stahl and de Wailly, Hetzel, 1908-1909

References
Notes

Sources
 Balduc, Florian, ed. (2016). Fantaisies Hoffmaniennes. Editions Otrante.   
 Polet, Jean-Claude, ed. (2000). Patrimoine littéraire européen: Index général (p. 591). De Boeck. 

19th-century French writers
French opera librettists
English–French translators
1804 births
Writers from Paris
1864 deaths
19th-century French translators